Cigarette burns are usually deliberate injuries caused by pressing a lit cigarette to the skin. They are a common form of child abuse and torture.

References

Child abuse
Physical torture techniques
Cigarettes